The Spanish ship Argonauta was a 80 gun ship of the line of the Spanish Navy. She initially had 24, 18 and 8 pounder guns spread over her lower, upper, quarter and forecastle decks, but by 1805 she carried 36-pounders instead of 24-pounders. Her original crew was 21 officers and 642 ratings and soldiers, though it was 956 at the Battle of Cape Finisterre and 800 at Trafalgar.

History
A sister ship of the Neptuno, she was ordered in November 1795 and launched in June 1798 in Ferrol, to the design of Julian Martín Retamosa. On 25 August 1800, she and the other ships of Joaquín Moreno's squadron (the Real Carlos, San Hermenegildo, San Fernando, San Antonio and San Agustín) fought off the British Ferrol Expedition.

By 1805 her original main battery of thirty 24-pounder guns had been replaced by the same number of 36-pounders. Unlike her sister Neptuno, the Argonauta retained her upper deck batter of thirty-two 18-pounders; the original quarter and forecastle decks armament of eighteen 8-pounders had been reduced by two, and instead twelve 30-pounder obuses (howitzers) had been added on those decks, so that her actual armament was 90 carriage guns. She also mounted four small 4-pounder obuses on the poop.

The Argonauta fought at the battle of Cape Finisterre on 22 July 1805. On the 21 October the same year she was present in Federico Gravina's second squadron at the battle of Trafalgar, under the command of Captain Antonio Pareja and his deputy, Frigate Captain Pedro Albarracin, and losing 60 dead and 148 wounded. She was captured and taken in tow by HMS Polyphemus, but she had to drop the tow during the storm which followed the battle. On 24 October HMS Defiance rescued survivors from the Argonauta and made a failed attempt to re-establish a tow. On 30 October the Argonauta sank, with her rescued survivors landed at Algeciras the following day.

Sources 

http://wrecksite.eu/wreck.aspx?215705
Todo a Babor. Argonauta
Batalla de Trafalgar. Navios Españoles
Militares y Navíos Españoles que participaron en Trafalgar (1) de Luís Aragón Martín
Militares y Navíos Españoles que participaron en Trafalgar (2) de Luís Aragón Martín
Todo a Babor. Batalla de Brión

1798 ships
Ships built in Spain
Ships of the line of the Spanish Navy
Maritime incidents in 1805
Shipwrecks in the Atlantic Ocean